Torrens Valley Christian School is a non-denominational Christian school providing a distinctive Christian environment to approximately 600 reception to year 12 students. The school is situated in Hope Valley, South Australia.

History 
The school was founded by the parents from the Reformed Church of Adelaide, Campbelltown, in 1980.

Principals

Notable alumni
 Matthew Glaetzer: Australian Olympic track cyclist
 Daniel Gorringe: AFL footballer Gold Coast Suns 2011-2015, Carlton Blues 2016-
 Emily Hodgson: Adelaide United Westfield W-League 2016-2018 squad, Young Matildas Squad 2018

References

Sources 
 
 Brian Vaatstra, A Short History of TVCS 1975-1983, 1 April 1984
 https://web.archive.org/web/20080718214920/http://tvcs.sa.edu.au/school.htm

Private schools in South Australia
Educational institutions established in 1980